Poropuntius faucis is a species of ray-finned fish in the genus Poropuntius which occurs in hill streams in the upper Chao Phraya basin in northern Thailand.

References 

faucis
Fish described in 1945